The realme X50 Pro 5G is a smartphone from the Chinese company Realme, released in February 2020.

realme X50 Pro 5G comes with 5G networks on all spectrums from all over the world. The phone can be used in 5G enabled countries and experience high speeds. The smartphone has a 6.44-inch full-HD+ Super AMOLED display with a refresh rate of 90Hz, protected by a Corning Gorilla Glass 5 on top.

The smartphone runs Android 10-based Realme UI. It comes with 6.44-inch full-HD+ (1080x2400 pixels) display with a 90Hz refresh rate. The smartphone runs on Qualcomm Snapdragon 865 SoC comes with 12GB of RAM and 256GB of onboard storage. The Realme X50 Pro 5G is equipped with a 4200mAh battery with 65W SuperDART (Realme's branded version of Oppo's SuperVOOC) charging technology.

Colours
Moss Green
Rust Red

References

External links
 Official realme X50 Pro 5G website
Realme mobile phones
Smartphones
Mobile phones introduced in 2020
Mobile phones with multiple rear cameras
Mobile phones with 4K video recording